The Monastery of Obona is a monastery in the village of Obona, Asturias, Spain.
It was declared a monumento nacional in 1982.

External links 

Monasteries in Asturias
Benedictine monasteries in Spain
Bien de Interés Cultural landmarks in Asturias